Lac Miroir is a lake in Hautes-Alpes, France.

Miroir